Kwak Sun-young (born May 11, 1983) is a South Korean actress. She is best known for her roles in Encounter (2018),VIP (2019), and Hospital Playlist (2020).

Filmography

Television series

Web series

Awards and nominations

References

External links 
 

1983 births
Living people
South Korean actresses
South Korean television actresses
Dongguk University alumni